George Victor Drogo Montagu, "Kim", 8th Duke of Manchester (Kimbolton, Huntingdon, Cambridgeshire, 17 June 1853 – Tandragee Castle, County Armagh, 18 August 1892), styled Lord Kimbolton from 1853 to 1855 and Viscount Mandeville from 1855 to 1890, was a British peer and Member of Parliament.

Background
Montagu was the eldest of the five children of William Drogo Montagu, 7th Duke of Manchester, and Countess Louise von Alten. He was educated at Eton.

Political and military career
In 1877 Montagu was elected to the House of Commons for Huntingdonshire, a seat he held until 1880. He was also a  lieutenant in the Huntingdon Militia. He was Worshipful Master freemason of Union Lodge No. 105 in 1879.

During the Zulu War 1879 he was appointed Aide de Camp to Sir Garnet Wolseley and according to a report in the Newsletter on one occasion "he was assegaied by a Zulu running amok and shot him".

Apart from his political career he also achieved the rank of captain in the Royal Irish Fusiliers. In 1890 he succeeded his father in the dukedom and took his seat in the House of Lords. He was declared bankrupt the same year.

Family

On 22 May 1876 at Grace Church, Manhattan, New York, New York County, New York, Mandeville married Consuelo Yznaga, the daughter of a wealthy Cuban plantation owner and a renowned beauty. Her older brother was New York banker Fernando Yznaga. It was widely accepted that he had married her for her $6 million dowry and she him for his titles. One of Consuelo Yznaga's closest friends, Edith Wharton, was said to have incorporated certain aspects of her friend's marriage in her unfinished novel, The Buccaneers. Their union produced a son and twin daughters: 
 William Montagu, 9th Duke of Manchester (3 March 1877 – 9 February 1947)
 Lady Jaqueline Mary Alva Montagu (27 November 1879 – 15 March 1895)
 Lady Alice Eleanor Louise Montagu (27 November 1879 – 10 January 1900), who died of consumption.

Personal life and death 
Prior to his marriage, Mandeville had been considered an inebriate, and was shunned by respectable society. His circle of closest friends in Ireland included Edward Russell, 24th Baron de Clifford; Derrick Westenra, 5th Baron Rossmore and Francis Needham, 3rd Earl of Kilmorey.

By 1882 Mandeville had spent so much of his wife's dowry on gambling and mistresses, that his father the 7th Duke, banished the couple to Tandragee Castle. After one year, he was back with his mistress music-hall singer Bessie Bellwood, and the couple was living apart in London. Mandeville cut all his ties with Bellwood in 1890. 

Manchester died in August 1892 of cirrhosis of the liver aged only 39, and was succeeded in his titles by his son William.

References

Kidd, Charles, Williamson, David (editors). Debrett's Peerage and Baronetage (1990 edition). New York: St Martin's Press, 1990.

External links 
 

1853 births
1892 deaths
George 3
Royal Irish Fusiliers officers
Members of the Parliament of the United Kingdom for English constituencies
UK MPs 1874–1880
Manchester, D8
George Montagu, 08th Duke of Manchester